A Perfect Match is a 1988 album by jazz pianist George Shearing and the singer Ernestine Anderson. The pair had previously appeared together on Shearing's 1988 live album Dexterity.

Reception

Scott Yanow reviewed the album for Allmusic and wrote that "...Shearing and Anderson mostly stick to standards and their versions uplift the veteran songs. "Body and Soul" is taken as a vocal-piano duet, while "The Best Thing for You" is given an instrumental treatment. Other highlights include Anderson's vocals on "I'll Take Romance," a heartfelt "I Remember Clifford," "On the Sunny Side of the Street" and "Some Other Time." Perfect Match is an excellent outing for all concerned".

Track listing 
 "Trust in Me" (Milton Ager, Jean Schwartz, Ned Wever) – 3:52
 "I'll Take Romance" (Oscar Hammerstein II, Ben Oakland) – 2:40
 "Body and Soul" (Frank Eyton, Johnny Green, Edward Heyman, Robert Sour) – 4:46
 "The Best Thing for You (Would Be Me)" (Irving Berlin) – 3:33
 "I Remember Clifford" (Benny Golson) – 4:54
 "On the Sunny Side of the Street" (Dorothy Fields, Jimmy McHugh) – 3:14
 "The Second Time Around" (Sammy Cahn, Jimmy Van Heusen) – 3:55
 "Falling in Love with Love" (Lorenz Hart, Richard Rodgers) – 3:01
 "That's for Me" (Hammerstein, Rodgers) – 4:28
 "I Won't Dance" (Fields, Otto Harbach, Hammerstein, Jerome Kern, McHugh) – 3:52
 "Some Other Time" (Cahn, Jule Styne) – 5:27
 "The Touch of Your Lips" (Ray Noble) – 2:25
 "Lullaby of Birdland" (George Shearing, George David Weiss) – 3:34
 "The Things We Did Last Summer" (Cahn, Styne) – 3:07

Personnel 
George Shearing – piano
Ernestine Anderson – vocals
Neil Swainson – double bass
Jeff Hamilton – drums
Production
Phil Edwards – engineer
Leonard Feather – liner notes
George Horn – mastering
Carl Jefferson – producer

References

1988 albums
Albums produced by Carl Jefferson
Concord Records albums
Ernestine Anderson albums
George Shearing albums